The 2003 Humboldt State Lumberjacks football team represented Humboldt State University during the 2003 NCAA Division II football season. Humboldt State competed in the Great Northwest Athletic Conference (GNAC).

The 2003 Lumberjacks were led by fourth-year head coach Doug Adkins. They played home games at the Redwood Bowl in Arcata, California. Humboldt State finished the season with a record of three wins and seven losses (3–7, 0–3 GNAC). The Lumberjacks were outscored by their opponents 198–268 for the 2003 season.

Schedule

References

Humboldt State
Humboldt State Lumberjacks football seasons
Humboldt State Lumberjacks football